Austroascia segersi is a species of Hoverfly in the family Syrphidae.

Distribution
Chile.

References

Eristalinae
Insects described in 1977
Diptera of South America
Taxa named by F. Christian Thompson
Endemic fauna of Chile